The women's 400 metre freestyle competition at the 2018 Pan Pacific Swimming Championships took place on August 11 at the Tokyo Tatsumi International Swimming Center. The defending champion was Katie Ledecky of the United States.

Records
Prior to this competition, the existing world and Pan Pacific records were as follows:

Results
All times are in minutes and seconds.

Heats
The first round was held on 11 August from 10:00.

Only two swimmers from each country may advance to the A or B final. If a country not qualify any swimmer to the A final, that same country may qualify up to three swimmers to the B final.

B Final 
The B final was held on 11 August from 18:00.

A Final 
The A final was held on 11 August from 18:00.

References

2018 Pan Pacific Swimming Championships